Wheel is the third album by Laura Stevenson, and the first to be credited solely to her. The album was released by Don Giovanni Records on April 23, 2013.

Track listing
 Renée
 Triangle
 Runner
 Every Tense
 Bells & Whistles
 Sink, Swim
 The Hole
 Eleonora
 The Move
 Journey to the Center of the Earth
 Telluride
 L-Dopa
 The Wheel

References

Laura Stevenson albums
2013 albums
Don Giovanni Records albums